A dust storm, also called a sandstorm, is a meteorological phenomenon common in arid and semi-arid regions. Dust storms arise when a gust front or other strong wind blows loose sand and dirt from a dry surface. Fine particles are transported by saltation and suspension, a process that moves soil from one place and deposits it in another.

The arid regions of North Africa, the Arabian peninsula, Central Asia and China are the main terrestrial sources of airborne dust. It has been argued that poor management of Earth's drylands, such as neglecting the fallow system, are increasing the size and frequency of dust storms from desert margins and changing both the local and global climate, as well as impacting local economies.

The term sandstorm is used most often in the context of desert dust storms, especially in the Sahara Desert, or places where sand is a more prevalent soil type than dirt or rock, when, in addition to fine particles obscuring visibility, a considerable amount of larger sand particles are blown closer to the surface. The term dust storm is more likely to be used when finer particles are blown long distances, especially when the dust storm affects urban areas.

Causes 

As the force of dust passing over loosely held particles increases, particles of sand first start to vibrate, then to move across the surface in a process called saltation. As they repeatedly strike the ground, they loosen and break off smaller particles of dust which then begin to travel in suspension. At wind speeds above that which causes the smallest to suspend, there will be a population of dust grains moving by a range of mechanisms: suspension, saltation and creep.

A study from 2008 finds that the initial saltation of sand particles induces a static electric field by friction. Saltating sand acquires a negative charge relative to the ground which in turn loosens more sand particles which then begin saltating. This process has been found to double the number of particles predicted by previous theories.

Particles become loosely held mainly due to a prolonged drought or arid conditions, and high wind speeds. Gust fronts may be produced by the outflow of rain-cooled air from an intense thunderstorm. Or, the wind gusts may be produced by a dry cold front: that is, a cold front that is moving into a dry air mass and is producing no precipitation—the type of dust storm which was common during the Dust Bowl years in the U.S. Following the passage of a dry cold front, convective instability resulting from cooler air riding over heated ground can maintain the dust storm initiated at the front.

In desert areas, dust and sand storms are most commonly caused by either thunderstorm outflows, or by strong pressure gradients which cause an increase in wind velocity over a wide area. The vertical extent of the dust or sand that is raised is largely determined by the stability of the atmosphere above the ground as well as by the weight of the particulates. In some cases, dust and sand may be confined to a relatively-shallow layer by a low-lying temperature inversion.

Drought and wind contribute to the emergence of dust storms, as do poor farming and grazing practices by exposing the dust and sand to the wind.

One poor farming practice which contributes to dust storms is dryland farming. Particularly poor dryland farming techniques are intensive tillage or not having established crops or cover crops when storms strike at particularly vulnerable times prior to revegetation. In a semi-arid climate, these practices increase susceptibility to dust storms. However, soil conservation practices may be implemented to control wind erosion.

Physical and environmental effects 

A sandstorm can transport and carry large volumes of sand unexpectedly. Dust and sand storms which come off the Sahara Desert are locally known as a simoom or simoon (sîmūm, sîmūn). The haboob (həbūb) is a sandstorm prevalent in the region of Sudan around Khartoum, with occurrences being most common in the summer.

The Sahara desert is a key source of dust storms, particularly the Bodélé Depression and an area covering the confluence of Mauritania, Mali, and Algeria. Sahara dust is frequently emitted into the Mediterranean atmosphere and transported by the winds sometimes as far north as central Europe and Great Britain.

Saharan dust storms have increased approximately 10-fold during the half-century since the 1950s, causing topsoil loss in Niger, Chad, northern Nigeria, and Burkina Faso. In Mauritania there were just two dust storms a year in the early 1960s; there are about 80 a year since 2007, according to English geographer Andrew Goudie, professor at the University of Oxford. Levels of Saharan dust coming off the east coast of Africa in June 2007 were five times those observed in June 2006, and were the highest observed since at least 1999, which may have cooled Atlantic waters enough to slightly reduce hurricane activity in late 2007.

Dust storms have also been shown to increase the spread of disease across the globe. Virus spores in the ground are blown into the atmosphere by the storms with the minute particles and interact with urban air pollution.

Short-term effects of exposure to desert dust include immediate increased symptoms and worsening of the lung function in individuals with asthma, increased mortality and morbidity from long-transported dust from both Saharan and Asian dust storms suggesting that long-transported dust storm particles adversely affects the circulatory system. Dust pneumonia is the result of large amounts of dust being inhaled.

Prolonged and unprotected exposure of the respiratory system in a dust storm can also cause silicosis, which, if left untreated, will lead to asphyxiation; silicosis is an incurable condition that may also lead to lung cancer. There is also the danger of keratoconjunctivitis sicca ("dry eyes") which, in severe cases without immediate and proper treatment, can lead to blindness.

Economic impact 
Dust storms cause soil loss from the drylands, and worse, they preferentially remove organic matter and the nutrient-rich lightest particles, thereby reducing agricultural productivity. Also, the abrasive effect of the storm damages young crop plants. Dust storms also reduce visibility, affecting aircraft and road transportation.

Dust can also have beneficial effects where it deposits: Central and South American rainforests get significant quantities of mineral nutrients from the Sahara; iron-poor ocean regions get iron; and dust in Hawaii increases plantain growth. In northern China as well as the mid-western U.S., ancient dust storm deposits known as loess are highly fertile soils, but they are also a significant source of contemporary dust storms when soil-securing vegetation is disturbed.

On Mars

Dust storms are not limited to Earth and have been known to form on other planets such as Mars. However, given Mars' much lower atmospheric pressure (roughly 1% that of Earth's), the intensity of Mars storms could never reach the kind of hurricane-force winds that are experienced on Earth. Martian dust storms are formed when solar heating warms the Martian atmosphere and causes the air to move, lifting dust off the ground. The chance for storms is increased when there are great temperature variations like those seen at the equator during the Martian summer.

See also 
 Coccidioidomycosis
 Dry line
 Dust storm warning
 Haboob
 Iberulites
 List of dust storms
 Mineral dust
 Saharan Air Layer
 Shamal (wind)
 Sirocco

References

External links 

 12-hour U.S. map of surface dust concentrations Mouse-over an hour block on the row for 'Surface Dust Concentrations'
 Dust in the Wind 
 Photos of the April 14 1935 and September 2 1934 dust storms in the Texas Panhandle hosted by the Portal to Texas History.
 University of Arizona Dust Model Page
 Photos of a sandstorm in Riyadh in 2009 from the BBC Newsbeat website
 Dust storm in Phoenix Arizona via YouTube

 
Weather hazards
Road hazards
Articles containing video clips
Hazards of outdoor recreation